Arthur Wallis Exell OBE (21 May 1901, in Birmingham – 15 January 1993, in Cheltenham) was initially an assistant and later Deputy Keeper of Botany at the British Museum during the years 1924–1939 and 1950–1962. A noted cryptographer, taxonomist and phytogeographer, he was notable for his furthering of botanical exploration in tropical and sub-tropical Africa, and was an authority on the family Combretaceae.
   
Exell's formal education started at Queen Elizabeth Grammar School in Warwickshire, and then King Edmund's School in Birmingham. From there he went on to Emmanuel College, Cambridge and was awarded an M.A. in 1926, having joined the British Museum as a second-class assistant on 11 August 1924, eventually becoming Deputy Keeper of Botany in 1950. He was entrusted with the Polypetalae, although his first paper was a morphological study of the hymenium in three species of fungus.

Exell's first contact with Africa was in 1932/3 when he travelled to the islands in the Gulf of Guinea – São Tomé and Principe, Bioko and Annobón. His reports on the expedition were published in 1944 as a "Catalogue of the Vascular Plants of S. Tome", which for many years served as the standard reference to the islands' flora. The expedition also acquainted Exell with the Portuguese botanists Luis Carrisso and Francisco de Ascensão Mendonça of Coimbra University. Accompanied by them and his wife, Exell launched into a study of the flora of Angola, at that time a Portuguese colony. Also in their group was John Gossweiler (1873–1952), the government botanist in Angola. During the journey Carrisso suffered a fatal heart attack. Exell continued his collaboration with Coimbra University and Mendonça, publishing the first volume of the "Conspectus Florae Angolensis" (1937–1951).

During the Second World War, Exell's knowledge of Portuguese – he was also fluent in French and German – led to his being seconded to the Government Communications Headquarters at Bletchley Park, and working as a cryptographer in Cheltenham. Returning to the British Museum (Natural History) in 1950, he founded the 'Association pour l'Etude Taxonomique de la Flore d'Afrique Tropicale' (AETFAT) and started the Flora Zambesiaca project, the flora covering the catchment area of the Zambesi River, which at the time comprised the Federation of Rhodesia and Nyasaland, Bechuanaland, the Caprivi strip and Mozambique. He visited the region in 1955 with Mendonça to make further collections. He was co-editor of Flora Zambesiaca from 1962 onwards, and was awarded a D.Sc. by the University of Coimbra in Portugal in 1962. In 1971 the Portuguese government conferred on him the 'Comendador Da Ordem De Santiago da Espada'. He also received the Order of the British Empire in 1961, and was a member of the Linnean Society of London and other scientific societies.

Exell left the British Museum as Deputy Keeper of Botany in 1962. While remote working, he carried out part-time work for the Royal Botanic Gardens, Kew. On his retirement, he and his wife moved to the village of Blockley in the Cotswolds, becoming involved in local affairs.

Associates
Mendonça, Francisco de Ascencão (1889–1982) (co-collector)
Wild, Hiram (1917–1982) (co-collector)
Gossweiler, John (1873–1952) (co-collector)
Carrisso, Luis Wettnich (1886–1937)

Family
Arthur and his brothers Maurice Herbert Exell (1905–1966) and Ernest George Exell (1907–1986) were the sons of William Wallis Exell
(1868 Ballarat, Victoria, Australia – 1938 Amersham, Buckinghamshire) and Jessie Clara Holmes (1869–1956). Arthur married Mildred Alice Haydon (25 January 1905 Wandsworth, London – August 1990 North Cotswolds, Gloucestershire) on 14 August 1929 at Wandsworth, Surrey. William Wallis Exell's parents were George Exell (1834–1921) and Sarah Wallis (1844–1909).

Eponymy
Numerous taxa were named in his honour
Exellia Boutique in Annonaceae

Barleria exellii Benoist
Hermbstaedtia exellii (Suess.) C.C.Towns.
Anisophyllea exellii P.A.Duvign. & Dewit
Piptostigma exellii R.E.Fr.
Anthericum exellii Poelln.
Marsdenia exellii C.Norman
Anisopappus exellii Wild
Impatiens exellii G.M.Schulze
Combretum exellii Jongkind
Kalanchoe exellii Raym.-Hamet
Geranium exellii J.R.Laundon
Perlebia exellii (Torre & Hillc.) A.Schmitz
Phragmanthera exellii Balle ex Polhill & Wiens
Hibiscus exellii Baker f.
Memecylon exellii A.Fern. & R.Fern.
Tridactyle exellii P.J.Cribb & Stévart
Pavetta exellii Bremek.
Psychotria exellii R.Alves, Figueiredo & A.P.Davis
Sabicea exellii G.Taylor

Publications
Mr. John Gossweiler's Plants from Angola and Portuguese Congo, 1926–1929 (Jl. of Bot., Suppl.)
Two new species of Terminalia from the Austral Islands and Mangareva (1936)
Parmi d'autres auteurs Conspectus Florae Angolensis (1937)
Catalogue of the Vascular Plants of S. Tome (with Principe and Annobon) (1944)
A Revision of the Genera Buchenavia and Ramatuella (Bulletin of the British Museum) – with Clive Anthony Stace (1963)
Joanna Southcott at Blockley and the Rock Cottage Relics (1977)

History of the Ladybird: With some Diversions on This and That (1989) 
Old Photographs of Blockley, Chipping Campden, Chipping Norton and Moreton in Marsh – Arthur Wallis Exell (1983)
Amazon Books

See also
Francisco de Ascensão Mendonça (1889–1982)

References

External links
Cipher Mysteries
Namibia/Mossamedes

English botanists
English taxonomists
British cryptographers
1901 births
1993 deaths
Alumni of Emmanuel College, Cambridge
20th-century British botanists
People from Birmingham, West Midlands
People from Blockley